George Edward Ellis (8 August 1814 – 20 December 1894) was a Unitarian clergyman and historian.

Biography
Ellis was born and died in Boston.  He graduated from Harvard in 1833, and then from the Divinity School in 1836. After two years' travel in Europe, he was ordained, on 11 March 1840, as pastor of the Harvard Unitarian Church, Charlestown, Massachusetts. From 1857 until 1863, he was professor of systematic theology in Harvard Divinity School. In 1864 he delivered before the Lowell Institute a course of lectures on the “Evidences of Christianity,” in 1871 a course on the “Provincial History of Massachusetts,” and in 1879 a course on “The Red Man and the White Man in North America” (1882). He resigned the pastorate of Harvard Church on 22 February 1869.

From September 1842 to February 1845, Ellis edited the Christian Register, at first alone and later with George Putnam, D.D. From 1849 to 1855, he edited the Christian Examiner. He was vice president and then president of the Massachusetts Historical Society, and was a member of the Board of Overseers of Harvard in 1850-54, serving for one year as its secretary. Harvard gave him the degree of D.D. in 1857, and that of LL.D. in 1883. Ellis was the fourth person who had received both these degrees from Harvard.  He was elected a member of the American Antiquarian Society in 1847, and would later serve as the society's secretary for domestic correspondence from 1890-1894.

The author Grace Atkinson Oliver married his son, John Harvard Ellis.

Works

 Lives of John Mason (1844), Anne Hutchinson (1845), and William Penn (1847), in Spark's “American Biography”
 Half Century of the Unitarian Controversy (Boston, 1857)
 Memoir of Dr. Luther V. Bell (1863)
 The Aims and Purposes of the Founders of Massachusetts, and their Treatment of Intruders and Dissentients (1869)
 Memoir of Jared Sparks (1869)
 Life of Benjamin Thompson, Count Rumford, in connection with an edition of Rumford's complete works, issued by the American Academy of Arts and Sciences (1871)
 (as editor) History of the Massachusetts General Hospital (1872) (See Massachusetts General Hospital.)
 History of the Battle of Bunker Hill (1875)
 Address on the Centennial of the Evacuation by the British Army, with an Account of the Siege of Boston (1876)
 Memoir of Charles Wentworth Upham (1877) (See Charles Wentworth Upham.)
 Memoir of Jacob Bigelow (1880) (See Jacob Bigelow.)
 Memorial History of Boston, three historical chapters (1880-1)
 History of the First church in Boston, 1630-1880, with Arthur Blake Ellis (1881)
 The Red Man and the White Man in North America (1882)
 Memoir of Nathaniel Thayer, A. M. (1885; Google Books, archive.org)
 Address on the 82d Anniversary of the New York Historical Society (1886)
 Narrative and Critical History of America, “The Religious Element in New England” and other chapters (1886)
 The Puritan Age and Rule in the Colony of Massachusetts Bay, 1629-85 (1888)
 Articles for the ninth edition of the Encyclopædia Britannica.

He published numerous sermons and addresses, and contributed to periodicals. He also printed privately memoirs of Charles Wentworth Upham and Edward Wigglesworth (1804–1876) (1877).

Family
In 1840 he married Elizabeth Bruce Eager. They had one child, and she died in 1842. In 1859, he married Lucretia Goddard Gould who died in 1869.

His brother, Rufus Ellis (born in Boston, 14 September 1819; died in Liverpool, 23 September 1885), was also a Unitarian clergyman. He graduated with honors from Harvard in 1838, and at the Cambridge Theological Seminary in 1841. He preached at Northampton, Massachusetts, then became the first Unitarian pastor in Rochester, New York, and returned to Northampton in 1843. From 1853 until his death, he was pastor of the First Church in Boston. He was also lecturer in the Harvard Divinity School in 1869 and 1871, and for several years before his death was editor of the Religious Monthly Magazine. Many of his discourses were published, including a series of sermons commemorating the 250th anniversary of the First Church, which were published in a volume (Boston, 1880).

Notes

References

Further reading

External links
 

1814 births
1894 deaths
American Unitarian clergy
19th-century American historians
American male non-fiction writers
Harvard Divinity School alumni
Harvard College alumni
Harvard Divinity School faculty
Clergy from Boston
Members of the American Antiquarian Society
19th-century American male writers
Historians from Massachusetts
19th-century American clergy